Goldenrod is an American streamliner land speed racing car which held the wheel-driven land speed record from 1965 to 1991. It was owned by Bob "Butch" and Bill Summers, of Ontario, California. Bob Summers drove the car to set the land speed record. The car was originally built in Southern California by a team that included James Crosby.

Before finding their final success, the two brothers contacted a fuel specialist and racing equipment pioneer and inventor named Tony Capanna, owner of Wilcap Co. (at that time in Torrance California).   They were having trouble getting the speed they wanted with the 4 engines set in 2 rows side by side. Capanna suggested they put the engines in line and have it streamlined. In this configuration it was called Goldenrod. Capanna advised them to get aerodynamic advice from a Lockheed engineer, Walter Korff. The Goldenrod configuration was refined during a wind tunnel test in the Caltech 10-foot wind tunnel. The resulting drag coefficient of 0.1165, with a front area of 8.53 square feet, is one of the lowest ever achieved for a car.

It was unofficially broken in 1991 by Al Teague with his supercharged Hemi-powered Spirit of '76, which went  which was short of the one percent increase required for an official record which would have been at least 413.36977 mph. Goldenrod was not supercharged, so it still held the class (AI-II-11) record until 21 September 2010, when Charles Nearburg in the Spirit of Rett increased this to 414.316 mph. The car went on tour for many years all across the U.S., then first ventured outside the country in 2000, when it was placed where the cricket pitch is, in the Goodwood Festival of Speed with the other land speed record cars. The surviving Summers brother, Bill, attended (Bob died in 1992).

The Henry Ford museum bought the car in 2002, restored her via a US government grant (Save America's Treasures), and had her on display as of September 2006. The restoration was performed by former Hot Rod Magazine editor John Baechtel of Landspeed Restorations and Mike Cook of Cook Motorsports, with grateful acknowledgment to the many contributors who supported the project. John Baechtel subsequently published a 300-page book about the Summers Brothers and the restoration of the Goldenrod entitled Goldenrod: The Resurrection of America's Speed King. See http://goldenrodbook.com

“It’s about time it went away,” Bill Summers told "LandSpeed" Louise Ann Noeth during an interview on the new record, “It’s been a long time to have that record - 44 years, 10 months and 12 days. My brother Butch and I did everything we could with that car and then sold it to the Henry Ford Museum."

Speaking of Charles Nearburg finally breaking Bob Summers' record, Bill Summers said: "That he [Nearburg] achieved those speeds with only two-wheel drive and one naturally aspirated engine is a phenomenal achievement, but they had good course conditions and when conditions are good, cars go fast."
Bill Summers died on 12 May 2011.

Notes

External links

 Summer Bros Page
 Hot Rod Magazine feature
 'Spirit of Rett' breaks 45-year old Goldenrod record
 Baechtel Landspeed Restorations
http://Goldenrodbook.com

Wheel-driven land speed record cars
Streamliner cars